Pilus conicus is a species of sea snail, a marine gastropod mollusk in the family Pseudococculinidae.

Description
The size of the shell is 1 mm.

Distribution
This species occurs in the Atlantic Ocean off New England, USA; in the Rockall Trough; in the Mediterranean Sea.

Description 
The maximum recorded shell length is 1 mm.

Habitat 
Minimum recorded depth is 913 m. Maximum recorded depth is 913 m.

References

External links
 

Pseudococculinidae
Gastropods described in 1884